Volkan Güç, (16 July 1980 in Adana, Turkey) is a Turkish volleyball player. He is member of the Turkey men's national volleyball team. He studied at Istanbul University.

He began his volleyball career in 1994 in Sasa Sports Club in Adana, where he played three years. In 2005, Volkan Güç transferred from Arçelik S.K. to Fenerbahçe Men's Volleyball. After playing for Halkbank Ankara, he moved first to Istanbul Büyükşehir Belediyespor, and finally in 2010 to Galatasaray Yurtiçi Kargo.

At the 2008 Men's European Volleyball League, he was named "Best Spiker".

References

1980 births
Sportspeople from Adana
Turkish men's volleyball players
Fenerbahçe volleyballers
Halkbank volleyball players
Galatasaray S.K. (men's volleyball) players
Arçelik volleyballers
Living people
Istanbul University alumni
21st-century Turkish people